Shuang Bijia (born 14 November 1997) is a Chinese footballer who plays as a left-winger.

Club career

Early career
Shuang started playing football at the High School Affiliated to Renmin University of China, playing for the school's football team, . Following his graduation, he spent time in the Hangzhou Greentown academy, joining in 2012, before deciding to move abroad to pursue a footballing career.

Move to Europe
Shaung moved to Spain in early 2016, and settled at Huesca, where he had a total of twenty-two goal involvements in eighteen under-19 appearances. His performances for Huesca at youth level caught the attention of Toledo, who signed him in September 2016. He was named in the squad for a Copa del Rey fixture against Villarreal in December 2016, and would go on to make his professional debut for Toledo in this game, coming on as a second-half substitute for Samu Villa, becoming the second Chinese player to feature in the Copa del Rey after Zhang Chengdong.

Despite this appearance, Shuang left Toledo in June 2017, joining Sariñena. He made his debut in a 2–0 loss to Tarazona, before going on to make a total of twelve appearances. In 2018, he played for the reserve teams of Alcorcón.

Return to China
Shuang returned to China for the 2019 season, joining Guizhou Hengfeng and being assigned to the reserve team. In August 2020, he joined China League Two side Kunming Zheng He Shipman, but would have to wait until May of the following year to make his debut.

Career statistics

Club

Notes

References

1997 births
Living people
Sportspeople from Kunming
Footballers from Yunnan
Chinese footballers
China youth international footballers
Association football wingers
Tercera División players
China League Two players
CD Toledo players
CD Sariñena players
AD Alcorcón footballers
AD Alcorcón B players
Guizhou F.C. players
Chinese expatriate footballers
Chinese expatriate sportspeople in Spain
Expatriate footballers in Spain